Donatien of Reims (also known as Donatien or Donat) was a 4th-century French saint and the 8th Bishop of Reims.

He died in AD 389, and in AD 863 the count of Flanders Baldwin I transferred his relics to the Church Saint-Agricol de Reims at Bruges, where his cult is still active.
He is revered as a saint and his feast day is locally celebrated on 14 October.

Legend
A legend has it that he was thrown as a child into a river, where a holy man took five candles and placed them on a water wheel which showed where the child had gone, and he was able to recover the child.
Saint Donatien is represented holding a wheel bearing candles.

References

389 deaths
Bishops of Reims
4th-century bishops in Gaul
4th-century Christian saints